Crooked Creek Township is one of eight townships in Cumberland County, Illinois, USA.  As of the 2010 census, its population was 422 and it contained 204 housing units.

Geography

Unincorporated towns
 Hazel Dell at

Cemeteries
The township contains these five cemeteries: Church of Christ, Church of God, Duck Pond, Ruffner and Washington.

Major highways
  U.S. Route 40
  Illinois Route 49

Demographics

School districts
 Casey-Westfield Community Unit School District 4c
 Cumberland Community Unit School District 77
 Jasper County Community Unit School District 1

Political districts
 State House District 109
 State Senate District 55

References
 
 United States Census Bureau 2009 TIGER/Line Shapefiles
 United States National Atlas

External links
 City-Data.com
 Illinois State Archives
 Township Officials of Illinois

Adjacent townships 

Townships in Cumberland County, Illinois
Charleston–Mattoon, IL Micropolitan Statistical Area
1860 establishments in Illinois
Populated places established in 1860
Townships in Illinois